The Dexiarchia are a suborder of sea slugs, shell-less marine gastropod molluscs in the order Nudibranchia.
This classification is based on the study by Schrödl et al., published in 2001, who recognized within this clade two clades Pseudoeuctenidiacea and Cladobranchia.

Taxonomy

Clade Pseudoeuctenidiacea  ( = Doridoxida) 
Superfamily Doridoxoidea
Family Doridoxidae

Clade Cladobranchia ( = Cladohepatica) 
Contains the subclades Euarminida, Dendronotida and Aeolidida
Not assigned to a superfamily (Metarminoidea)
Family Charcotiidae
Family Dironidae
Family Embletoniidae
Family Goniaeolididae
Family Heroidae
Family Madrellidae
Family Pinufiidae
Family Proctonotidae

Subclade Euarminida
Superfamily Arminoidea
Family Arminidae
Family Doridomorphidae

Subclade Dendronotida
Superfamily Tritonioidea
Family Tritoniidae
Family Aranucidae
Family Bornellidae
Family Dendronotidae
Family Dotidae
Family Hancockiidae
Family Lomanotidae
Family Phylliroidae
Family Scyllaeidae
Family Tethydidae

Subclade Aeolidida
Superfamily Flabellinoidea ( = Pleuroprocta)
Family Flabellinidae
Family Notaeolidiidae
Superfamily Fionoidea
Family Fionidae
Family Calmidae
Family Eubranchidae
Family Pseudovermidae
Family Tergipedidae
Superfamily Aeolidioidea
Family Aeolidiidae
Family Facelinidae
Family Glaucidae
Family Piseinotecidae

References

Nudipleura
Nudibranchia